The 1940 Major League Baseball season was contested from April 16 through October 8, 1940. Both the American League (AL) and National League (NL) had eight teams, with each team playing a 154-game schedule. The Cincinnati Reds won the World Series over the Detroit Tigers in seven games. Hank Greenberg of the Tigers and Frank McCormick of the Reds won the Most Valuable Player Award in the AL and NL, respectively.

Awards and honors

Most Valuable Player
Hank Greenberg (AL) – OF, Detroit Tigers
Frank McCormick (NL) – 1B, Cincinnati Reds
The Sporting News Player of the Year Award
Bob Feller – P, Cleveland Indians
The Sporting News Most Valuable Player Award
Hank Greenberg (AL) – OF, Detroit Tigers
Frank McCormick (NL) – 1B, Cincinnati Reds
The Sporting News Manager of the Year Award
Bill McKechnie – Cincinnati Reds

Statistical leaders

1 American League Triple Crown Pitching Winner

Standings

American League

National League

Postseason

Bracket

Season overview 
The 1940 MLB season was dominated by stars such as Joe DiMaggio, Bob Feller, Hank Greenberg, and Frank McCormick. Bob Feller took home the American league pitching triple crown by having the most wins, strikeouts and lowest era in his respective league. Debs Garms led the entire league in batting average by hitting .355. Hank Greenberg and Johnny Mize led their respective leagues in homerun's and runs batted in by having (41,150) and (43,137). The Sporting News Manager of the Year Award went to Bill McKechnie for leading his team to the World Series and winning it. The World Series was won in Game 7 by the Reds over the Tigers, due to a strong pitching performance by Paul Derringer.

1940 All Star Game 
This was the 8th time the MLB all star game "mid summer classic" had been played. It was held in St. Louis Missouri at Sportsman's Park on July 9, 1940. The NL was led to victory by the lone home run of the game by Max West of the Braves and they won the game 4–1. The two starting pitchers of the game were Red Ruffing of the New York Yankees for the American League who took the loss for this game and Paul Derringer of the Cincinnati Reds for the National League who got the win in this game.

The starting rosters for both the National League and the American League are shown below:

World Series 
In a 7 game world series between the Detroit Tigers and the Cincinnati Reds the Cincinnati Reds won in game 7. The 1940 World Series was a showdown between the best team in each league. The Reds were led by NL MVP Frank McCormick and the Tigers were led by AL MVP Hank Greenberg. This series game down to the last game where Paul Derringer threw a complete game, allowing no earned runs, and the Reds won 2-1.

Managers

American League

National League

Home Field Attendance

Events 
April 16, 1940 – Bob Feller pitches his first career no hitter on opening day against the Chicago White Sox. This no hitter remains the only no hitter ever on opening day.

April 23, 1940 – Pee Wee Reese makes his Major League Baseball debut for the Brooklyn Dodgers. Pee Wee Reese later in his career goes into the Hall of Fame.

June 6, 1940 – Warren Spahn signs with the Boston Bees. Spahn later becomes a pitcher icon and wins the Cy young award.

July 9, 1940 – All star game held at Sportsman Park in St. Louis Missouri. The National League beat the American League 4–1 with help from Max West's home run.

September 24, 1940 – Jimmie Foxx "The Beast" hits his 500th career home run.

October 8, 1940 – The Cincinnati Reds defeat the Detroit Tigers in game 7 of the World Series. This is the second time the Reds have won the World Series, they were led by NL MVP Frank McCormick.

References

External links

1940 Major League Baseball season schedule at Baseball Reference

 
Major League Baseball seasons